The 1928 United States presidential election in Texas took place on November 6, 1928, as part of the 1928 United States presidential election which was held throughout all contemporary forty-eight states. Voters chose 20 representatives, or electors, to the Electoral College, who voted for president and vice president.

Background
Ever since statehood, Texas had been very nearly the strongest state for the Democratic Party owing to its initial history being as a Deep South state based around slavery. Even during Reconstruction when African Americans were briefly enfranchised, the Republican Party won just one statewide election. By the time Texas participated in its first postbellum election in 1872, cracks were emerging in Republican Reconstruction plans, so that the Democratic "Redeemers" gained control of Southern legislatures by 1874.

After "Redemption" and the passing of a new constitution in 1876 the GOP became confined largely to areas of abolitionist German "Forty-Eighter" settlement in the Hill Country, and to a few South Texas counties where local Republican bosses could outcompete their Democratic equivalents. The Terrell Election Law created a poll tax that, from 1902, disenfranchised virtually all remaining African-American voters, the vast majority of Mexican Americans, and also most poor whites. Voter turnout among males over twenty-one fell from over eighty percent to under thirty percent following introduction of the poll tax. The period following this disfranchisement nonetheless saw a substantial amount of typically "Progressive" reform under Governors James Stephen Hogg and Thomas M. Campbell, and despite this progressive faction ceding power in 1906 to the conservatives, Texas proved solid in its support for progressive candidate Woodrow Wilson at the 1912 Democratic National Convention. In the meantime, Texas continued to vote solidly Democratic: between 1904 and 1924 no Republican nominee reached 24% of the statewide vote total.

Anti-Catholic fear
However, with all other prominent Democrats sitting the election out, the party nominated Al Smith, four-term Governor of New York as its nominee for 1928, with little opposition, despite disagreement among Texas Democrats like Governor Moody, plus "Pa" and "Ma" Ferguson. Smith had been the favorite for the 1924 nomination, but had lost due to opposition to his Catholic faith and "wet" views on Prohibition: he wished to repeal or modify the Volstead Act.

Once Smith was nominated – despite his attempt to dispel fears by nominating "dry" Southern Democrat Joseph T. Robinson as his running mate – extreme fear ensued in the South, which mostly had little to no experience of the Catholic immigrants from southern and eastern Europe who were Smith's local constituency. Southern fundamentalist Protestants believed that Smith would allow papal and priestly leadership in the United States, which Protestantism was a reaction against. There was also much opposition to Smith's support for repealing Prohibition, most notably from minister J. Frank Norris, who became the centre of the anti-Smith campaign, saying that

The Southern Baptist Convention similarly said that

Smith's campaign managers responded to this criticism by saying that the "Hoovercrats" were "Republicans, Klansmen and Bolsheviks".

Vote
Hoover won the Lone Star State by a narrow margin of 3.67 percent. His victory in the state made him the first Republican presidential candidate to carry Texas. He produced a swing of over 32 percent compared to the vote for Calvin Coolidge in 1924; however, there were huge variations. The traditionally Republican Texas German counties of Comal and Guadalupe, along with the former 1920 Ferguson counties of Lee and Washington voted overwhelmingly for Smith in appreciation of his views on Prohibition: in Comal County, which had been Robert La Follette's strongest nationwide in 1924, the Democratic vote rose from 13 to 78%, thus supporting La Follette's family's endorsement of Smith after he died.

In contrast, numerous Baptist High Plains counties saw Hoover gain over fifty percent relative to Coolidge due to vehement opposition to Catholicism and repeal of Prohibition. Hoover was also helped by a powerful vote from the emerging middle class in Dallas–Fort Worth and Houston: his combined margin in Harris, Dallas and Tarrant Counties was slightly larger than his statewide plurality. East Texas, the earliest-settled region of the state with greatest white resentment of the Republican Party's association with Reconstruction, and South Texas, in which white voters had similar fears of Mexican-American political power, remained normally loyal to Smith.

Texas wouldn't support another Republican presidential candidate until 1952 when native Texan Dwight D. Eisenhower carried the state. , this is the last election in which Maverick County voted for a Republican presidential candidate.

Results

Results by county

Notes

See also
 United States presidential elections in Texas

References

Texas
1928
1928 Texas elections